Emil Grozev (born 15 March 1991) is a Bulgarian footballer currently playing as a defender for FC Botev Lukovit.

References

External links

1991 births
Living people
Bulgarian footballers
PFC Litex Lovech players
FC Chavdar Etropole players
FC Lyubimets players
FC Vereya players
FC Botev Vratsa players
First Professional Football League (Bulgaria) players
Association football defenders